Choclococha (possibly from Quechua chuqllu corncob, qucha lake, "corncob lake") is a large lake in the Huancavelica Region of Peru. It is situated in the Castrovirreyna Province, Santa Ana District and in the Huaytará Province, Pilpichaca District. Choclococha lies east of a lake named Orcococha and north of Caracocha.

The Choclococha dam was completed in 1960.

See also
List of lakes in Peru

References

INEI, Compendio Estadistica 2007, page 26

External links
Flickr image

Lakes of Peru
Lakes of Huancavelica Region
Dams in Peru
Buildings and structures in Huancavelica Region